In linguistics, a false friend is a word in a different language that looks or sounds similar to a word in a given language, but differs significantly in meaning. Examples of false friends include English embarrassed and Spanish embarazada 'pregnant'; English parents versus Portuguese parentes and Italian parenti (both meaning 'relatives'); English demand and French demander 'ask'; and English gift, German Gift 'poison', and Norwegian gift 'married'.

The term was introduced by a French book, Les faux amis: ou, Les trahisons du vocabulaire anglais (False friends, or, the betrayals of English vocabulary), published in 1928.

As well as producing completely false friends, the use of loanwords often results in the use of a word in a restricted context, which may then develop new meanings not found in the original language. For example, angst means 'fear' in a general sense (as well as 'anxiety') in German, but when it was borrowed into English in the context of psychology, its meaning was restricted to a particular type of fear described as "a neurotic feeling of anxiety and depression". Also, gymnasium meant both 'a place of education' and 'a place for exercise' in Latin, but its meaning became restricted to the former in German and to the latter in English, making the expressions into false friends in those languages as well as in Ancient Greek, where it started out as 'a place for naked exercise'.

Definition and origin 

False friends are bilingual homophones or bilingual homographs, i.e., words in two or more languages that look similar (homographs) or sound similar (homophones), but differ significantly in meaning.

The origin of the term is as a shortened version of the expression "false friend of a translator", the English translation of a French expression introduced by Maxime Kœssler and Jules Derocquigny in their 1928 book, with a sequel, Autres Mots anglais perfides.

Causes 
From the etymological point of view, false friends can be created in several ways.

Shared etymology 

If language A borrowed a word from language B, or both borrowed the word from a third language or inherited it from a common ancestor, and later the word shifted in meaning or acquired additional meanings in at least one of these languages, a native speaker of one language will face a false friend when learning the other. Sometimes, presumably both senses were present in the common ancestor language, but the cognate words got different restricted senses in Language A and Language B.

Actual, which in English is usually a synonym of real, has a different meaning in other European languages, in which it means 'current' or 'up-to-date', and has the logical derivative as a verb, meaning 'to make current' or 'to update'. Actualise (or 'actualize') in English means 'to make a reality of'.

The word friend itself has cognates in the other Germanic languages; but the Scandinavian ones (like Swedish frände, Danish frænde) predominantly mean 'relative'. The original Proto-Germanic word meant simply 'someone whom one cares for' and could therefore refer to both a friend and a relative, but lost various degrees of the 'friend' sense in Scandinavian languages, while it mostly lost the sense of 'relative' in English. (The plural friends is still, rarely, used for "kinsfolk", as in the Scottish proverb Friends agree best at a distance, quoted in 1721.)

The Estonian and Finnish languages are closely related, which gives rise to false friends such as swapped forms for south and south-west:

Or Estonian vaimu 'spirit; ghost' and Finnish vaimo 'wife'; or Estonian huvitav 'interesting' and Finnish huvittava 'amusing'.

A high level of lexical similarity exists between German and Dutch, but shifts in meaning of words with a shared etymology have in some instances resulted in 'bi-directional false friends':

The Italian word confetti "sugared almonds" has acquired a new meaning in English, French and Dutch; in Italian, the corresponding word is coriandoli.

English and Spanish, both of which have borrowed from Ancient Greek and Latin, have multiple false friends, such as:

English and Japanese also have diverse false friends, many of them being wasei-eigo and gairaigo words.

Homonyms 

In Swedish, the word rolig means 'fun': ett roligt skämt ("a funny joke"), while in the closely related languages Danish and Norwegian it means 'calm' (as in "he was calm despite all the commotion around him"). However, the Swedish original meaning of 'calm' is retained in some related words such as ro, 'calmness', and orolig, 'worrisome, anxious', literally 'un-calm'. The Danish and Norwegian word semester means term (as in school term), but the Swedish word semester means holiday. The Danish word frokost means lunch, the Norwegian word frokost means breakfast.

Pseudo-anglicisms 

Pseudo-anglicisms are new words formed from English morphemes independently from an analogous English construct and with a different intended meaning.

Japanese is replete with pseudo-anglicisms, known as wasei-eigo ("Japan-made English").

Semantic change 
In bilingual situations, false friends often result in a semantic change—a real new meaning that is then commonly used in a language. For example, the Portuguese humoroso (“capricious”) changed its meaning in American Portuguese to “humorous”, owing to the English surface-cognate humorous.

The American Italian fattoria lost its original meaning, “farm”, in favor of “factory”, owing to the phonetically similar surface-cognate English factory (cf. Standard Italian fabbrica, “factory”). Instead of the original fattoria, the phonetic adaptation American Italian farma became the new signifier for “farm” (Weinreich 1963: 49; see “one-to-one correlation between signifiers and referents”).

This phenomenon is analyzed by Ghil'ad Zuckermann as “(incestuous) phono-semantic matching”.

See also 
 Auto-antonym
 Equivalence in language translation
 Etymological fallacy
 False cognate
 False etymology
 Folk etymology
 Linguistic interference (language transfer)
 Swenglish

References

External links 

 wikt:Category:False cognates and false friends on Wiktionary
 An online hypertext bibliography on false friends 
 Spanish/English false friends
 French/English false friends
 Italian/English false friends
 English/Russian false friends
 English/Dutch false friends
 LanguageTool support for false friends according to rules in this format.
 Die Deutschen und ihr Englisch. The devil lies in the detail (tagesspiegel.de, 2015)
 Der DEnglische Patient – Kolumne von Peter Littger  (Manager Magazin, 2016)

False friends
Error